The meridian 71° east of Greenwich is a line of longitude that extends from the North Pole across the Arctic Ocean, Asia, the Indian Ocean, the Southern Ocean, and Antarctica to the South Pole.

The 71st meridian east forms a great circle with the 109th meridian west.

From Pole to Pole
Starting at the North Pole and heading south to the South Pole, the 71st meridian east passes through:

{| class="wikitable plainrowheaders"
! scope="col" width="120" | Co-ordinates
! scope="col" | Country, territory or sea
! scope="col" | Notes
|-
| style="background:#b0e0e6;" | 
! scope="row" style="background:#b0e0e6;" | Arctic Ocean
| style="background:#b0e0e6;" |
|-
| style="background:#b0e0e6;" | 
! scope="row" style="background:#b0e0e6;" | Kara Sea
| style="background:#b0e0e6;" |
|-
| 
! scope="row" | 
| Bely Island
|-
| style="background:#b0e0e6;" | 
! scope="row" style="background:#b0e0e6;" | Malygina Strait
| style="background:#b0e0e6;" |
|-
| 
! scope="row" | 
| Yamal Peninsula
|-
| style="background:#b0e0e6;" | 
! scope="row" style="background:#b0e0e6;" | Gulf of Ob
| style="background:#b0e0e6;" |
|-
| 
! scope="row" | 
|
|-
| 
! scope="row" | 
|
|-
| 
! scope="row" | 
|
|-
| 
! scope="row" | 
|
|-
| 
! scope="row" | 
|
|-
| 
! scope="row" | 
|Passing just east of Kokand
|-
| 
! scope="row" | 
|
|-
| 
! scope="row" | 
|
|-
| 
! scope="row" | 
|
|-
| 
! scope="row" | 
|Khyber Pakhtunkhwa - for about 9 km
|-
| 
! scope="row" | 
|
|-valign="top"
| 
! scope="row" | 
|Khyber Pakhtunkhwa Punjab
|-
| 
! scope="row" | 
| Rajasthan
|-
| 
! scope="row" | 
| Sindh
|-
| 
! scope="row" | 
| Gujarat
|-
| 
! scope="row" | 
| Sindh - for about 10 km
|-valign="top"
| 
! scope="row" | 
| Gujarat Dadra and Nagar Haveli and Daman and Diu - for about 1 km
|-valign="top"
| style="background:#b0e0e6;" | 
! scope="row" style="background:#b0e0e6;" | Indian Ocean
| style="background:#b0e0e6;" | Passing just west of Danger Island, Passing just east of Grande Terre, 
|-
| style="background:#b0e0e6;" | 
! scope="row" style="background:#b0e0e6;" | Southern Ocean
| style="background:#b0e0e6;" |
|-valign="top"
| 
! scope="row" | Antarctica
| Australian Antarctic Territory, claimed by 
|-
|}

See also
70th meridian east
72nd meridian east

e071 meridian east